Echinosaura palmeri, Palmer's teiid, is a species of lizard in the family Gymnophthalmidae. It is found in Panama and Colombia.

References

Echinosaura
Reptiles described in 1911
Taxa named by George Albert Boulenger